Camp Toccoa (formerly Camp Toombs) was a basic training camp for United States Army paratroopers during World War II  west of Toccoa, Georgia. Among the units to train at the camp was the 506th Infantry Regiment. The regiment's Company E ("Easy Company") were portrayed in the 2001 HBO miniseries Band of Brothers.

Construction
The training camp known as Camp Toombs was conceived in 1938. The Georgia National Guard and the Works Projects Administration began construction on 17 January 1940 with the site being dedicated on 14 December 1940. Initially it was known as Camp Toombs after Confederate Civil War General Robert Toombs. But Colonel Robert Sink, commander of the 506th Parachute Infantry Regiment, one of the first units to train there, did not like the name. He thought it would prompt superstitions among the arriving young recruits, that after travelling down Route 13 passed the Toccoa Casket Company they would be arriving at Camp "Tombs". Sink persuaded the Department of the Army to change the name to Camp Toccoa.

Wartime operations

The U.S. Army took over the site in 1942 when it had few buildings or permanent structures. Most personnel had to be housed in tents. Permanent barracks only became available after the first trainees had begun to arrive. Jump training was initially done at the nearby Toccoa municipal airport. But following a training accident, the airport was considered to have a runway too short for safe C-39 and C-47 take off and landings. All further jump training was relocated to Fort Benning, Georgia. As Camp Toccoa lacked a rifle range, trainees were marched  to Clemson Agricultural College, a military school in South Carolina to practice at the college's shooting range.

All paratroopers trainees were required to regularly run up Currahee Mountain which overlooked Camp Toccoa. This arduous task was memorialized in the HBO series, Band of Brothers, with the shout "three miles up, three miles down." Members of the 506th Parachute Infantry Regiment refer to themselves as "Currahees" (it is anglicized name derived from the Cherokee word gurahiyi, which may mean "standing alone"). Currahee Mountain is on the insignia of the 506th regiment in recognition of the peak's importance in the formation of the regiment.

Notable units that underwent training at Camp Toccoa were:
 501st Parachute Infantry Regiment: attached to the 101st Airborne Division
 506th Parachute Infantry Regiment: attached to the 101st Airborne Division
 507th Parachute Infantry Regiment: attached to the 82nd Airborne Division and the 17th Airborne Division
 511th Parachute Infantry Regiment: attached to the 11th Airborne Division
 517th Parachute Infantry Regiment: attached to the 17th Airborne Division and the 13th Airborne Division
 457th Parachute Field Artillery Battalion: attached to the 11th Airborne Division
 295th Ordnance Heavy Maintenance Company (FA): completed basic training at Camp Toccoa, from July 21, 1943, through November 24, 1943.
 296th. Ordnance Heavy Main Company (CT): completed basic training at Camp Toccoa, from July 21, 1943, through November 24, 1943

In 1943, comedian Bob Hope visited Camp Toccoa. He told the recruits, "You guys are so rugged, you look like Wheaties with legs." After the defeat of Japan, the US Army handed Camp Toccoa back to state control in 1946.

Post war use
In the late 1940s, it became a satellite camp of Georgia State Prison, which primarily housed young offenders. However, after repeated escapes, the unit was moved to a new facility at Alto, Georgia in the 1950s. Part of the site was eventually occupied by the Patterson Pump Company, which makes industrial, flood, fire and HVAC pumps.

Preservation
In 2012 an organization, Camp Toccoa at Currahee, a not-for profit foundation, was formed to celebrate the lives and contributions of the Airborne paratroopers who trained at Camp Toccoa at Currahee Mountain during World War II. A plan was set forth to restore the facilities at the camp site. The only original remaining building from WWII was the training camp's  mess hall.

In commemoration of all the paratrooper trainees that ran the same route, the Colonel Robert F. Sink memorial trail follows Currahee Mountain Road from the site of former Camp Toccoa to the summit of Currahee Mountain. The start of the trail is marked by a commemorative plaque dedicating the trail to "Col. Bob" Sink from the Five-O-Sinks (506th Parachute Infantry Regiment Association). The trail is currently the venue for the Annual Currahee Challenge, a three- and six-mile race on the mountain that occurs in the fall.

References

External links
  Camp Toccoa at Currahee Project

Closed installations of the United States Army
Landmarks in Georgia (U.S. state)
Buildings and structures in Stephens County, Georgia
Forts in Georgia (U.S. state)
1940 establishments in Georgia (U.S. state)
1946 disestablishments in Georgia (U.S. state)